Metso Outotec Oyj is a Finnish publicly traded company that was established in 2020 when Outotec and Metso Minerals merged. The company is focusing on providing technology and services for aggregates, minerals processing and metals refining industries.

History

Background of Metso and Outotec
Outotec’s history started in 1940 as a state-owned copper company, Outokumpu, where they came up with the idea of manufacturing copper without the aid of external energy. The flash smelting method thrived and as a result, a new technology unit was founded. This unit was later named Outokumpu Technology.

Metso was founded in 1999 when Valmet and Rauma merged. In 2013, Metso demerged into two separate publicly traded companies. Metso’s pulp, paper and energy production business units formed Valmet Oyj while mining, construction and automation business units formed Metso Oyj.

Background of the merger
In July 2019, it was announced that Outotec and Metso Minerals will be combined, forming a new organization called Metso Outotec. Simultaneously, Metso’s valve business area, Metso Flow Control, would be demerged and renamed Neles. The goal of the merger was to create a company that offers process technology, equipment and services for minerals, metals, and aggregates business areas. Matti Alahuhta, the chair of the board of Metso Outotec, stated that Metso Minerals and Outotec complemented each other exceptionally well, since almost none of their operations were overlapping but rather consequent in the industry value chain. Also, the customers were from different parts of the world: Metso Minerals was focused on North and South America, whereas Outotec’s customers were located in Europe, Middle East and Africa.  It was estimated that the merger would create 100 million euros in cost savings and 150 million euros in cost synergies due to combining the business operations. 

The merger was officialized in an auxiliary general meeting held in October 2019. According to prior information, the biggest investors were in favor of the merger. The merger also had to be approved by the competition authority.

European Commission accepted the merger in May 2020. Metso’s owners received most of the new company, 78%. Metso’s CEO Pekka Vauramo was appointed as the CEO of Metso Outotec. Outotec’s CEO Markku Teräsvasara was appointed as the executive vice president. Mikael Lilius, the chair of the board of Metso, was appointed as the chair of the board of Metso Outotec and the chair of the board of Outotec, Matti Alahuhta, was appointed as the vice president of the board of Metso Outotec.

Metso Outotec (2020–)
Metso Outotec started its operations in July 2020 and employed more than 15,000 people worldwide in more than 50 countries. It had six business areas: Aggregates, Minerals, Metals, Recycling, Services and Consumables. Pekka Vauramo started as the CEO of the company. The executive board commenced strategy work and it was promised that a joint budget would be formed before the end of the year. The company's focus was on providing technology and services for mining, aggregates, recycling and metal refining industries.

The company stated that they are going to explore for synergy benefits in over 300 different operations. They were aiming annually for 150 million euros in turnover savings due to the benefits of synergy. The company had 190 offices of which 40 were going to be closed. When the co-operation negotiations were finished, the company announced that they were going to cut 254 jobs and that they were going to sell both of their recycling business lines. Over half of the company’s net sales came from the services and the biggest business area was minerals, which contributed 60 per cent of the net sales.

By November 2021, apart from a few millions, the 120 million euros savings were achieved. The company had prepared for the effect of inflation by raising their prices monthly. For example, the logistic expenses had come up by 20 million euros compared to the previous year. In December, the company announced that they were going to sell their Metals recycling business unit to a subsidiary of a Swedish company Mimir. Previously they had already renounced the Waste recycling business area.

In January 2022, Metso Outotec announced an organizational change in which Hydrometallurgy was moved from Metals business area to Minerals business area. Metals remained with business lines Smelting, Metals and Chemical Processing, Ferrous and Heat Transfer, as well as related aftermarket services. In March 2022, Metso Outotec announced that they had temporarily ceased all deliveries to Russia. Previous year, the net sales from Russia was 10% of the total net sales of the company. The company did not have its own production nor sourcing in Russia.

In February 2023, Metso Outotec Board of Directors announced a proposal to shareholders on company name change from Metso Outotec Corporation to Metso Corporation. The grounds for the proposal were that the post-merger integration of the two companies had been completed and that the company strategy going forward focused on a strong unified company brand. Shareholder vote on the proposal is scheduled for annual general meeting on May 3, 2023.

Organization 

Metso Outotec employs over 15,600 people  in over 50 countries.

In the beginning of 2022, Metso Outotec had three reporting segments:
Aggregates
Minerals and
Metals

Pekka Vauramo is the CEO of the company and Kari Stadigh is the chair of the board.

Owners
Holdings
February 28th, 2022, the biggest Metso Outotec shareholders were: 

 Solidium
 Varma Mutual Pension Insurance Company
 Ilmarinen Mutual Pension Insurance Company
 Elo Mutual Pension Insurance Company
 The State Pension Fund of Finland
 OP Financial Group
 Mandatum Life
 Svenska Litteratursällskapet i Finland
 Aktia Capital
 Eläkevakuutusosakeyhtiö Veritas

Markets
Metso Outotec provides technology and services for mining, aggregates and metal refining industries.

The company has customers in Africa, Europe, North and South America and Middle East. For example, Metso Outotec has delivered grinding mills to ArcelorMittal’s Las Truchas iron ore in Mexico, a copper smelter to Indonesia  and a vertical mill to Ferrexpo iron ore in Ukraine.

Metso Outotec’s products include for example a vertical mill called Vertimill, which is used in mines to crush rocks. The vertical mill that utilizes gravity and double rotary screws, consuming less energy than traditional ball mills. Vertical mill technology was invented in Japan in 1950’s. Metso bought the vertical mill license in 1979 and continued developing it further. By 2021, approximately 400 vertical mills had been delivered to different parts of the world.

Metso Outotec’s competitors include for instance Swedish Sandvik and Epiroc that have similar business operations.

Corporate social responsibility
Metso Outotec is committed to limiting global warming to 1.5 degrees. In 2021, the company announced new, more ambitious sustainability targets. Metso Outotec aims for net-zero by 2030.

References

External links 

Engineering companies of Finland
Manufacturing companies based in Helsinki
Companies listed on Nasdaq Helsinki
Mining equipment companies
Manufacturing companies established in 2020
2020 establishments in Finland
Finnish brands
Pulp and paper companies of Finland